WYYX (97.7 FM) is a commercial radio station located in Panama City Beach, Florida that has its transmitter licensed for Bonifay, Florida, broadcasting to the Panama City, Florida area.

The station began live and local morning content in 2012 when they moved the then personalities of "Afternoon Riot" to the morning drive time position, naming the program "The Stroke and ShortBus Radio Show" after the respective hosts.  In the summer of 2013, ShortBus was promoted to middays and the morning show was entitled simply "Stroke Radio Show" which currently airs 6–10 on weekday mornings. Stroke has been with 97X since 2004.  ShortBus, who is a former morning show host and now serves as the middays on-air personality, has been with the station since 2005.  Both ShortBus and Stroke have worked as personalities on every day part on the station.  Other notable on-air personalities include Paco, who hosts "Afternoon Riot" weekday afternoons, 2pm-6pm and "Hard Drive XL with Lou Brutus" airs 6 pm until 11 pm.  The nighttime program is the only syndicated show to air on weekdays on the station.

History

Originally WTBB (Townsend Broadcasting), it began as a local station in 1983, using mostly a pre-recorded format, and was housed in the old Bank of Bonifay building. Manager Larry Donaldson also carried local ballgames and political events, and even had the occasional local remote. Most people thought he owned the station until it sold in 1992 and he moved on.

From 1992 to 1997, the station was known as "Pirate Radio 97.7". Upon the change from WTBB to WYYX, they renamed themselves "97X".

On August 8, 2016, WYYX went silent; its "97X" active rock format moved to WVVE 100.1 FM Panama City Beach.

On November 2, 2016, WYYX changed their call letters to WVVE.

On March 15, 2017, WVVE returned to the air with active rock, branded as "97X", returning the format to the 97.7 FM frequency. On March 17, 2017, WVVE changed their call letters to WYYX.

Since the launch of 97X in 1997, its Active Rock format has shifted towards a Mainstream Rock lean, with classic rock (e.g. Led Zeppelin, Metallica) interspersed occasionally.

References

External links

YYX
Radio stations established in 1983
1983 establishments in Florida